Major General Sir Geoffrey Taunton Raikes,  (7 April 1884 – 27 March 1975) was a British Army general who achieved high office in the 1930s.

Military career
Educated at Radley College and the Royal Military College, Sandhurst, Raikes was commissioned into the South Wales Borderers in 1903. He was seconded to the Egyptian Army from 1913 to 1915. He served in the First World War and in April 1918 found himself as Commanding Officer of the 2nd Battalion, South Wales Borderers at Armentières, where the battalion suffered heavy losses.

After the war, Raikes became an Instructor at the Senior Officers School in 1922 before attending the Staff College, Camberley from 1924 to 1925 and moving on to be Chief Instructor of Military History and Tactics at the Royal Military College, Sandhurst. He was appointed Commanding Officer of the 1st Battalion, South Wales Borderers in 1931 and then reverted to being an Instructor at the Senior Officers School. He was made commander of the 9th Infantry Brigade in 1935 and then retired in 1938.

During the Second World War, Raikes was recalled to be General Officer Commanding (GOC) of the 38th (Welsh) Infantry Division of the Territorial Army (TA).

Raikes was very keen on scouting. He was also Lord Lieutenant of Brecknockshire from 1948 to 1959.

References

Bibliography

External links
Generals of World War II

 

|-
 

1884 births
1975 deaths
British Army major generals
Academics of the Royal Military College, Sandhurst
British Army personnel of World War I
British Army generals of World War II
Knights Bachelor
Lord-Lieutenants of Brecknockshire
Companions of the Order of the Bath
Companions of the Distinguished Service Order
South Wales Borderers officers
Graduates of the Royal Military College, Sandhurst
Graduates of the Staff College, Camberley
People educated at Radley College
Military personnel from London
People from Chislehurst